Richard Bristowe was a Member of Parliament for Appleby in March 1416.

References

14th-century births
15th-century deaths
15th-century English politicians
Year of birth missing
Year of death missing
Place of birth missing
Place of death missing
Members of Parliament for Appleby
People from Appleby-in-Westmorland
English MPs March 1416